Super de Boer was a Dutch supermarket chain. The holding company which owned Super de Boer, Super de Boer N.V., was formerly named Laurus N.V.. It changed its name to that of its only remaining retail brand in January 2008.

Super de Boer supermarkets were partly owned by franchisors. The French food retail group Casino Guichard purchased a 37% stake in the firm in 2002, and increased this to 57% by 2008. The firm agreed to be taken private by Dutch rival Jumbo in October 2009 in a deal worth €552 million, with Casino selling its entire stake.

History
The Super de Boer name comes from grocery stores opened by brothers Evert and Jan de Boer in 1925 and 1932.  The two De Boer chains merged in 1970. In 1997, De Boer and rival Unigro formed De Boer Unigro. The De Boer supermarket chain was merged with Unigro's Super to form Super de Boer. In 1998, De Boer Unigro merged with Vendex N.V. to form Laurus, which had plans to rebrand all the stores under the Konmar name. In 2003, Laurus stopped the rebranding operation because of disappointing results. Existing Konmar stores were either transformed back to Super de Boer or remained using the Konmar brand. In 2004, Laurus started renewing the store's image in "Operation Refresh Express". The goal of this renewal was to shake off the old, expensive image, as well as to freshen up the stores and private label products. Then, in 2006, Laurus decided to sell all of the Konmar and Edah stores to third parties, leaving Super de Boer as the only asset left for Laurus.

References

External links
 Super de Boer official site
 Super de Boer N.V. official site
 Corporate history

Companies based in Utrecht (province)
Defunct supermarkets of the Netherlands
Amersfoort